Edvaldo Oliveira Chaves (born 4 August 1958 in Nilópolis, Rio de Janeiro State, Brazil), best known as Pita, is a former association footballer in offensive midfielder role, currently works as General Manager by Desportivo Brasil.

Career 
In career he played for clubs Santos FC (1978–1984), São Paulo (1985–1988), RC Strasbourg in France (1988–1989), Guarani (1989–1990), in Japan Japan Soccer League, Japan Football League and J1 League with Fujita Industries and Nagoya Grampus Eight (1990–1993), and closed career with Inter Limeira in 1994.

Titles 
He won three São Paulo State League (1978, 1985, 1987), and one Brazilian League (1986). For Brazil national football team he got 7 international caps from 1980 and won the 1987 Pan American Games.

Club statistics

National team statistics

Managerial statistics

References

External links

 
 

1958 births
Living people
Brazilian footballers
People from Nilópolis
Brazilian expatriate footballers
Brazil international footballers
Association football midfielders
Santos FC players
São Paulo FC players
RC Strasbourg Alsace players
Guarani FC players
Shonan Bellmare players
Nagoya Grampus players
Campeonato Brasileiro Série A players
Ligue 1 players
Japan Soccer League players
J1 League players
Japan Football League (1992–1998) players
Expatriate footballers in Japan
Expatriate footballers in France
Brazilian football managers
Expatriate football managers in Japan
J1 League managers
Urawa Red Diamonds managers
São Paulo FC managers
Pan American Games gold medalists for Brazil
Pan American Games medalists in football
Footballers at the 1987 Pan American Games
Medalists at the 1987 Pan American Games
Sportspeople from Rio de Janeiro (state)